St. Mary's Church was a medieval church located in Oslo, Norway. The church ruins are located in Middelalderparken near the neighborhood of Sørenga in the borough of Gamlebyen.

History
St. Mary's Church had been built of stone in stages with final additions made in the 14th century. A major remodeling in the 1200s gave the church a new Gothic choir. Major rebuild in the 1300s added two large towers to the west and a new and large cruciform choir. It was the royal chapel and had an important political role, as its provost from 1314 also was Chancellor of Norway. The church was set on fire in connection with the Swedish war of independence from the Kalmar Union in 1523. In the aftermath of the Protestant Reformation, it was so dilapidated that it could not be repaired and was demolished in 1542.

Excavations were first conducted in 1867 by Nicolay Nicolaysen (1817-1911) under the direction of Gerhard Fischer  (1890–1977) and later in the 1960s under the leadership of Håkon Christie (1922–2010). Traces of an older wooden structure were discovered which were dated by Håkon Christie to around the year 1050. Remains of two people, deemed to be King Haakon V and his Queen consort Euphemia of Rügen, were discovered during excavations of the ruins of the church and re-interred in the Royal Mausoleum in Akershus Castle.

The area where the Norwegian Crown Prince Residence of Skaugum is located today in the municipality of Asker,  originally belonged to the St. Mary's Church.

References 

Oslo Old Town
Mary's
Ruins in Norway
Mary
Church ruins in Norway
Archaeological sites in Norway